Several naval ships of Japan have been named :

 , lead ship of her class of the Imperial Japanese Navy during World War I
 JDS Sakura (PF-290), a Kusu-class patrol frigate of the Japan Maritime Self-Defense Force, formerly USS Carson City (PF-50)

See also 
 Sakura (disambiguation)
 , a class of destroyers of the Imperial Japanese Navy

Imperial Japanese Navy ship names
Japanese Navy ship names